A metadata registry is a central location in an organization where metadata definitions are stored and maintained in a controlled method.

A metadata repository is the database where metadata is stored. The registry also adds relationships with related metadata types. A metadata engine collects, stores and analyzes information about data and metadata (data about data) in use within a domain.

Use of metadata registries
Metadata registries are used whenever data must be used consistently within an organization or group of organizations.  Examples of these situations include:
 Organizations that transmit data using structures such as XML, Web Services or EDI
 Organizations that need consistent definitions of data across time, between databases, between organizations or between processes, for example when an organization builds a data warehouse
 Organizations that are attempting to break down "silos" of information captured within applications or proprietary file formats
Central to the charter of any metadata management programme is the process of creating trusting relationships with stakeholders and that definitions and structures have been reviewed and approved by appropriate parties.

Common characteristics of a metadata registry
A metadata registry typically has the following characteristics:
 Protected environment where only authorized individuals may make changes
 Stores data elements that include both semantics and representations
 Semantic areas of a metadata registry contain the meaning of a data element with precise definitions
 Representational areas of a metadata registry define how the data is represented in a specific format, such as in a database or a structured file format (e.g., XML)

Clear separation of semantics and system-specific constraints
Because metadata registries are used to store both semantics (the meaning of a data element) and systems-specific constraints (for example the maximum length of a string) it is important to identify what systems impose these constraints and to document them.  For example the maximum length of a string should not change the meaning of a data element.

The International Organization for Standardization (ISO) has published standards for a metadata registry called ISO/IEC 11179 and also ISO15000-3 and ISO15000-4 ebXML registry and repository (regrep) EbXML RegRep

International standards
There are two international standards which are commonly referred to as metadata registry standards: ISO/IEC 11179 and ISO 15000-3. There are some who believe that ISO/IEC 11179 and ISO 15000-3 are interchangeable or at least in some way similar. e.g.

"Of interest is that the ISO 11179 model was one of the inputs to the ebXML RIM (registry information model) and so has much functional equivalence to the "registry" region of the ISO 11179 conceptual model." 

This is however incorrect. Although the specification ebRIM v2.0 (5 December 2001) says at the beginning in its Design Objectives: "Leverage as much as possible the work done in the OASIS [OAS] and the ISO 11179 [ISO] Registry models" 
by the time of ebRIM v3.0 (2 May 2005) all reference to ISO/IOEC 11179 is reduced to a mention under informative references on page 76 of 78. 
It was recognised by some team members that the ebXML RIM data model had no place to store "fine grained artifacts"  ie. the data elements which are at the heart of ISO/IEC 11179, but not until 2009 can an explicit and definitive statement from the team be found.

ISO/IEC 11179
ISO/IEC 11179 says that it is concerned with "traditional" metadata: "We limit the scope of the term as it is used here in ISO/IEC 11179 to descriptions of data - the more traditional use of the term."
Originally the standard named itself a "data element" registry. It describes data elements: "data elements are the fundamental units of data" and "data elements themselves contain various kinds of data that include characters, images, sound, etc."
It also describes a registry with an analogy: "This is analogous to the registries maintained by governments to keep track of motor vehicles. A description of each motor vehicle is entered in the registry, but not the vehicle itself."

ebXML
The ebXML RIM says about its Repository and Registry that it is
 "... capable of storing any type of electronic content such as XML documents, text documents, images, sound and video … RepositorytItems (sic) are stored in a content repository".
It also says that it is
 "... capable of storing standardized metadata that MAY be used to further describe RepositoryItems" which metadata "… are stored in the registry".
It also describes itself with "...this familiar metaphor. An ebXML Registry is like your local library. The repository is like the bookshelves in the library. The repository items in the repository are like book (sic) on the bookshelves." It goes on to say "The registry is like the card catalog … A RegistryObject is like a card in the card catalog."

What should be immediately apparent is that something which holds catalogue cards is not "like" a catalogue, it IS a catalogue.

Unfortunately for a number of organisations that have implemented ebXML RIM to satisfy a requirement for an ISO/IEC 11179 registry, ebXML RIM
 is neither a registry
 nor does it store metadata.
It is
 a "content repository"
 and a "metacontent catalogue".

Metadata registry roles
A metadata registry is frequently set up and administered by an organization's data architect or data modeling team.

Data elements are frequently assigned to data stewards or data stewardship teams that are responsible for the maintenance of individual data elements through a secure system.

Metadata element workflow
Metadata registries frequently have a formal data element submission, approval and publishing approval process.  Each data element should be accepted by a data stewardship team and reviewed before data elements are published.  After publication change control processes should be used.

Metadata navigation, search and publishing
Metadata registries are frequently large and complex structures and require navigation, visualization and searching tools.  Use of hierarchical viewing tools are frequently an essential part of a metadata registry system.  Metadata publishing consists of making data element definitions and structures available to both people and other   systems.

Examples of public metadata registries
 Agency for Healthcare Research and Quality- United States Health Information Knowledgebase (USHIK) 
 Apelon Medical Registry 
 Australian Institute of Health and Welfare 
 Dublin Core Metadata Registry 
 Knowledge Network for Biocomplexity 
 Cancer Data Standards Repository 
 Global Justice XML Data Model (GJXDM) 
 Minnesota Department of Education Metadata Registry (K-12 Data)
 National Information Exchange Model 
 NIST ebXML Registry for HL7 / HIMSS / IHE 
 Open Metadata Registry (formerly the National Science Digital Library (NSDL) Metadata Registry) 
 Portal of Medical Data Models
 US Department of Defense Metadata Registry (requires sponsored registration) 
 US Environmental Protection Agency - Environmental Data Registry

Metadata registry vendors / solutions 
In alphabetical order:
 a.k.a. software by Synercon
 Aristotle Metadata Registry  (ISO/IEC 11179 metadata registry) - Wikipedia page
 ASG Rochade
 Data Advantage Group MetaCenter
 IBM Business Glossary, Metadata Server & Metadata Workbench
 InfoLibrarian Metadata Integration Framework
 Informatica Metadata Manager and Business Glossary
 Jumper 2.0 open-source Enterprise 2.0 metadata registry
 Manta Tools
 Masai Technologies M:GRID
MetadataWorks METADATA EXCHANGE
Octagon Research Solutions ViewPoint MDR
 Oracle MDS
 SAS Metadata Repository
 SOA Software Semantics Manager
 Software AG's webMethods OneData 11179-compliant, Metadata Registry
 The Society of Motion Picture and Television Engineers Metadata Dictionary; Registry of Metadata Element Descriptions
 freebXML Registry, A royalty-free open source project implementing OASIS ebXML RegRep standard
 Wellfeet Software's WellGEO RegREP product provides an integrated Registry and Repository specialized for Geographical and Semantic Information management

See also
In alphabetical order:
 Controlled vocabulary
 Data dictionary
 Data element
 Domain Specific Language (DSL)
 Domain-Specific Modeling (DSM)
 ebXML RegRep (ebXML Registry and Repository)
 Global Justice XML Data Model (GJXDM or Global JXDM)
 ISO/IEC 11179
 ISO 15000
 Knowledge tagging
 Meta-Object Facility (MOF)
 Metadata
 Metadata Online Registry (METeOR)
 Metadata publishing
 Metamodeling
 Model Transformation Language (MTL)
 Model-based testing (MBT)
 Model-driven engineering
 National Information Exchange Model (NIEM)
 Object Constraint Language (OCL)
 Ontology (computer science)
 Queries/Views/Transformation (QVT)
 Simple Metadata Registry
 VIsual Automated model TRAnsformation (VIATRA)
 XML Metadata Interchange (XMI)

References 

Open Forums on Metadata Registries, in reverse chronological order:
   15th International Open Forum on Metadata Registries Meets at the TMF (2012 - Berlin, Germany)
 11th International Forum on Metadata Registries (2008 - Sydney, Australia)
 10th International Forum on Metadata Registries (2007 - NYC, USA)
 9th International Forum on Metadata Registries (2006 - Kobe, Japan)
 8th International Forum on Metadata Registries (2005 - Berlin, Germany)
 7th International Forum on Metadata Registries (2004 - Xian, China)
 On ISO 11179 versus ebXML (in "On metadata and metacontent")

 
Metadata
ISO/IEC 11179